Villanova Ballpark at Plymouth is a baseball stadium in Plymouth Meeting, Pennsylvania.  It is the home field of the college baseball team of Villanova University, the Wildcats.  The stadium holds 750 spectators.

Prior to the venue's construction, Villanova played on campus at McGeehan Field until 1998 and at Richie Ashburn Field from 1999 to 2002.

See also
 List of NCAA Division I baseball venues

References

External links
Venue information

College baseball venues in the United States
Villanova Wildcats baseball
Baseball venues in Pennsylvania
Baseball in Philadelphia
Buildings and structures in Montgomery County, Pennsylvania
2003 establishments in Pennsylvania
Sports venues completed in 2003
Plymouth Meeting, Pennsylvania